Stegemann may refer to:

Albert Stegemann (born 1976), German politician
Kerstin Stegemann (born 1977), German footballer

See also
Stegeman (disambiguation)